Kihorogota is an administrative ward in the Iringa Rural district of the Iringa Region of Tanzania. In 2016 the Tanzania National Bureau of Statistics report there were 8,044 people in the ward, from 7,688 in 2012.

Villages / vitongoji 
The ward has 8 villages and 28 vitongoji.

 Igula
 Ilogombe
 Madibila
 Maganga
 Nyambala
 Ismani (T)
 Lugolola
 Lwang’a
 Lyanika
 Mtiulaya
 Ivangwa
 Ivangwa
 Mdendami
 Kihorogota
 Danida
 Kihorogota
 Mgugumbalo
 Njiapanda
 Mikong'wi
 Kichangani
 Lupembe
 Shuleni
 Utitili
 Ndolela
 Kibaoni
 Ndolela
 Ofisini
 Ngano
 Godauni A
 Godauni B
 Lyaveya
 Mwang’ingo
 Uhominyi
 Tumaini
 Ubena
 Uhominyi

References 

Wards of Iringa Region